Sara Yael Hirschhorn is currently the Visiting Assistant Professor of Israel Studies at Northwestern University. She was formerly the University Research Lecturer and Sidney Brichto Fellow in Israel and Hebrew Studies at the University of Oxford, historian and author. In May 2017, Harvard University Press published her first book City on a Hilltop: American Jews and the Israeli Settler Movement. She began fieldwork for the book in 2008.

She is a contributor at the Tony Blair Institute for Global Change, as well as news publications such as The New York Times, Haaretz, The Times of Israel and Jewish Chronicle. She is considered an expert Diaspora-Israel relations, the Arab-Israeli Conflict, and Israeli domestic politics, including Israel's ultra-nationalist movement].

Career
In 2017, her research was published by The Atlantic, reporting that 60,000 out of 400,000 (roughly 15 percent) of settlers on Israel's West Bank are American.

In 2018, she became the visiting Assistant Professor of Israel Studies at Northwestern University's Crown Family Center for Jewish and Israel Studies.

In 2019, Haaretz covered her research into American Jews' role in the US settler movement, including her analysis of Baruch Goldstein. Hirschhorn has mainly focused her research on Diaspora-Israel relations.

Hirschhorn is currently working on a new book project on Zionism, Identity Politics, and Jewish Power Since 1967.

Apart from her academic work, she is also frequent public speaker, media commentator, and foreign policy consultant.

Awards
In 2018, Hirschhorn was awarded silver medal (Choice Award) as runner-up to Ilana Kurshan in the Sami Rohr Prize for Jewish Literature, winning an $18,000 prize for City on a Hilltop.

Selected publications
 City on a Hilltop: American Jews and the Israeli Settler Movement. Harvard University Press, 2017.

References

Living people
Place of birth missing (living people)
Year of birth missing (living people)
American women non-fiction writers
21st-century American women writers
21st-century American non-fiction writers
Northwestern University faculty
American women academics